Velmurugan Borewells is a 2014 Indian Tamil-language romantic comedy film directed by Gopi M P and starring Mahesh, Ganja Karuppu, Aarushi and Ragasya.

Cast 

Mahesh as Ramesh
Ganja Karuppu
Aarushi
Ragasya as Dhanam
IT Arasan
Theepetti Ganesan
Pandi
 Vengal Rao
Singamuthu
Manobala
Imman Annachi
O. A. K. Sundar
Mayilsamy
K. P. Jagan

Production 
The film is directed by Gopi of Malayan fame. Comedian Ganja Karuppu turned producer with this film and bought a borewell truck for the film. Aarushi, who starred in Azhagan Azhagi (2013), worked on this film alongside another unreleased Mahesh-starrer Adhithalam. Ragasya was cast opposite Ganja Karuppu. The film reportedly has a similar storyline to Lingaa (2014); however, director Gopi claims that this film's storyline is not inspired from that film.

Soundtrack 
Music by Srikanth Deva. Ameer, Samuthirakani, AR Murugadoss and Karu Pazhaniappan attended the film's audio launch.

Reception 
A critic from iFlicks wrote that "Kanja Karuppu who has produced this film has done his part with good comedy. Songs are good in Srikanth Deva's music. Director M.P.Gopi gets an appreciation for filming a normal village story to a beautiful screenplay". A critic from Dinamalar noted how it was "comforting that the film was not needlessly boring" while also praising the acting, music and cinematography. The film was also reviewed by Maalaimalar.

Controversy 
After the film's failure at the box office, Ganja Karuppu went into debt. During the production of the film, the film stopped midway due to lack of money. Ganja Karuppu loaned out his property land and finished the film. He lodged against Gopi and executive director Kalaiyappan for not returning the land.

References 

2010s Tamil-language films
Indian romantic comedy films